Bingwen is a Chinese masculine given name. Bearers of the name include:

 Geng Bingwen (1334–1403), Ming dynasty general
 Su Bingwen (1892–1975), Nationalist Chinese general
 Sun Bingwen (1885–1927), Chinese communist revolutionary
 Bingwen, a character in Orson Scott Card's Formic Wars series, first appearing in Earth Afire

Chinese masculine given names